The Story So Far... is a 1990 rockumentary by English rock band Supertramp, featuring interviews with the band members telling the story of the band, and concert footage from the 1983 world tour promoting ...Famous Last Words..., filmed in Toronto and Munich. Originally released by A&M Records on VHS in 1990, it received a DVD version in 2002 that featured some of the band's music videos as extras. The cover art is the same as the greatest hits compilation The Very Best of Supertramp.

Track listing

Live line-up

 Roger Hodgson: lead vocals, backing vocals, lead guitar, 12-string guitar, grand piano, Wurlitzer, synthesizers, pump organ
 Rick Davies: lead vocals, backing vocals, grand piano, Wurlitzer, synthesizers, organ, harmonica
 John Helliwell: saxophones, clarinet, backing vocals
 Dougie Thomson: bass guitar, backing vocals
 Bob Siebenberg: drums
 Scott Page: saxophones, flute, guitars, backing vocals
 Fred Mandel: keyboards, guitars, backing vocals

Certifications

References

Supertramp albums
Documentary films about rock music and musicians
1990 video albums